Aren Palik is a Micronesian political figure. He has been Vice President of the Federated States of Micronesia from September 2022.

Palik graduated from Eastern Oregon State College in 1982. He has worked in the financial sector in Micronesia. He was the CEO of Pacific Islands Development Bank at the time when he was elected to the Congress of the Federated States of Micronesia in 2019. In the Congress he represented the State of Kosrae.

References

Living people
People from Kosrae
Vice presidents of the Federated States of Micronesia
Members of the Congress of the Federated States of Micronesia
Eastern Oregon University alumni
Year of birth missing (living people)